Superstition is a 1982 American supernatural slasher film directed by James W. Roberson and starring James Houghton, Albert Salmi, and Lynn Carlin. The plot follows a family who move into a house that was once the site of a witch's execution. Though shot in 1981, Superstition was not released in US before 1985.

In the United Kingdom, the film was banned during the "video nasty" panic, though it would subsequently be released uncut under the title The Witch.

Plot
Two young men are brutally murdered by an unseen force in an abandoned house after playing a prank on a young couple outside in their car. A short time later, Inspector Sturgess and his partner Hollister visit Reverend David Thompson, a new clergyman assigned to the local parish who is assuming the role of an elderly minister, Reverend Maier. The abandoned house being on church's property, Sturgess voices concern about the house being a local dumping ground, and cites the recent murders of the two teenage boys, which he believes are occult-driven, as well as the drownings that have occurred in the pond next to the home.

David, Maier, Sturgess and Hollister visit the property. They meet Arlen, the mute caretaker, who appears to be mentally ill. Elvira, Arlen's aging mother, resides in an adjacent bungalow. Sturgess suspects Arlen of the recent murders. While standing on the pond's dock after chasing Arlen, Hollister is dragged into the water by an unseen assailant. Enraged after hearing of David's plans to have the pond drained, Arlen eludes the police and disappears. Sturgess and Maier interview Elvira, but she tells them only that Arlen is obeying some mysterious "mistress."

In the house, David meets Mary, a friendly young girl who claims to have once lived there. Maier blesses the building, but is killed by the blade from a table saw in a freak accident. Shortly after, the alcoholic Reverend George, his wife Melinda, and their adolescent children Ann, Sheryl, and Justin move into the house as guests of the church. On their move-in date, a renovator is killed by a clawed figure who hangs him to death in an elevator shaft inside the home. While the children go swimming in the pond, Ann discovers a severed human hand, later determined to be that of Hollister. The event results in Ann having a psychological breakdown.

In the house's basement, Justin is attacked and murdered by the claw-handed figure. Sturgess and other police mount a search for Justin in and around the house. Meanwhile, Ann has nightmares of her family being slaughtered. David unearths an antique crucifix from the pond, which Elvira claims has kept a witch, executed on the property centuries ago, dormant. David subsequently unearths a book in the church archives documenting a local inquisition that occurred in 1692, during which Elondra Sharack, a woman accused of murdering a nine-year-old girl named Mary, was executed in the pond by drowning. At the moment of her death, the church erupted in flames.

While searching the house, Sturgess discovers Arlen hiding in a secret room in the basement, and also uncover the body of the renovator. Arlen is arrested, while Sturgess remains at the house to further investigate. In the secret room, he is killed by the witch. Melinda attempts to venture downstairs, but discovers Justin's body hanging in the doorway. She is then attacked by the witch, who corner her into the kitchen where she beats her brutally. Upstairs, Ann and Sheryl are startled by the commotion. George attempts to intervene, and David subsequently arrives at the house, bearing the crucifix. George barricades himself in his bedroom, and discovers Melinda's bloodied body in their bed. The witch appears in the window and causes a mirror in the room to explode, the shards of it slashing George to death.

David attempts to save Ann and Sheryl, but Sheryl flees into the attic to hide, where the witch kills her by driving a stake through her head. David instructs Ann to go outside and wait in his van, and is attacked by the witch moments later, but she vanishes before she is able to kill him. David exits the house, and finds Ann's dead body inside his van. Despondent, he takes cans of gasoline to the pond, pours them in it, and lights it on fire. Mary appears to him and reveals herself as another form of the witch; David drives the crucifix through her heart and she falls backwards into the pond. The disturbance seems over, but before David can leave, Elondra's hand erupts from the pond and drags him under water, drowning him.

Cast

Production
Superstition was an independent production filmed in 1981 in Silver Lake, Los Angeles under the title The Witch but was shelved until four years later.

Release
Superstition was released theatrically in Italy in 1982.

Frank Moreno, the president of Almi Pictures, promoted the film similarly to how he promoted Almi Pictures release of House by the Cemetery. This included giving the film a trailer with what he described as "a sense of humor" and having "Brother Theodore do the voice over in order to attract a secondary audience.
Superstition received a brief release theatrically on the West coast of the United States before being released directly to home video in January 1985.

Critical response
In a review published by the New York Daily News, Superstition was negatively compared to The Amityville Horror (1979), and it was noted: "Like many contemporary fright films, Superstition substitutes escalating gore for suspense. It's also a victim of the bloated running time required to justify its single feature. Had [it] been cut as effectively as its characters, sliced to say, 70 minutes...  it might have attained, despite its weak script, the lofty level of watchable." Lou Cedrone of The Baltimore Sun panned the film, writing: "There isn't much mystery to Superstition...  There is much pain, boredom and violence—but mysterious it, is not." Cedrone also criticized the film for its featuring the murder of a thirteen-year-old boy. The Boston Globes Jay Carr deemed it a "how-much-can-you-take? splatflick," adding that director Roberson "invests its low-grade guignol with more urgency than it deserves and I hope he gets a shot at something better."

The Hackensack Records Lou Lumenick similarly criticized the film's violent content, describing it as a "schlocky slasher film...  incorporating elements of Poltergeist, represented by an orgy of modestly spooky special effects in the final reel." Critic Joe Bob Briggs alternately praised the film for its gore effects, awarding it three out of four stars.

AllMovie described the film as a "Flamboyant, giallo-style gore effects are the only highlight of this otherwise pedestrian supernatural horror film"

Home media
Superstition was released on DVD by Anchor Bay Entertainment in 2006. On April 16, 2019, Scream Factory released the film for the first time on Blu-ray.

References

External links
 

1980s slasher films
1982 horror films
1982 films
American haunted house films
American supernatural horror films
American independent films
American slasher films
Films about witchcraft
Films shot in California
Films shot in Los Angeles
Supernatural slasher films
1980s American films